The Adventures of the Hersham Boys is an album by punk band Sham 69, released in 1979. It's their most successful album to date, charting at #8 in the UK.

Reception 

It was not universally well received, with David Hepworth describing it as "A tired, hollow effort struggling between weary attempts at rabble-rousing and blush-making pseudo-Springsteen 'street' songs that reek of desperation and contract fulfilling. As empty and self-satisfied a record as anything they supposedly set out to replace."

Track listing
All songs by Jimmy Pursey and Dave Parsons unless noted
 "Money" - 3:13
 "Fly Dark Angel" - 3:03
 "Joey's on the Street Again" - 3:04
 "Cold Blue in the Night" - 2:47 (Dave "Kermit" Tregunna)
 "You're a Better Man Than I" - 3:10 (Mike Hugg) (Yardbirds/Manfred Mann Chapter Three cover)
 "Hersham Boys" - 4:46
 "Lost on Highway 46" - 3:35
 "Voices" - 2:52 (Ricky Goldstein, Pursey)
 "Questions and Answers" - 3:14
 "What Have We Got" (Live) - 2:54
CD reissue bonus tracks
 "Questions and Answers" (Single Version) - 3:18
 "I Gotta Survive" - 1:31
 "With a Little Help from My Friends" - 2:36 (John Lennon, Paul McCartney) (The Beatles cover) 
 "Hersham Boys" (7" Version) - 3:25
 "I Don't Wanna" (Live) - 2:06
 "Rip Off" (Live) - 2:43
 "I'm a Man, I'm a Boy" (Live) - 2:10
 "Tell Us the Truth" (Live) - 2:06
 "Borstal Breakout" (12" Single Version) - 8:25
 "If the Kids Are United" (12" Single Version) - 16:20
Tracks 11-13 from "Questions and Answers" single, March 1979
Tracks 14-18 from "Hersham Boys" single, August 1979
Tracks 19 and 20 released as 12" with initial copies of The Adventures of the Hersham Boys

Personnel
Sham 69
Jimmy Pursey - vocals, producer
Dave Parsons - guitar
Dave Tregunna - bass
Ricky Goldstein - drums
Mark "Doidie" Cain - drums; vocals on "With a Little Help from My Friends" (departing Sham 69 soon after the completion)
Technical 
Peter Wilson - producer
Jo Mirowski - art direction, design
Peter Lavery - photography
Tim Turan - mastering
Brett Ewins - illustrations

References

1979 albums
Sham 69 albums
Polydor Records albums